Spyros Baxevanos (born 17 January 1971) is a Greek professional football manager and former player. He is the father of Nikos Baxevanos.

References

1971 births
Living people
Greek footballers
Apollon Pontou FC players
Olympiacos Volos F.C. players
Thermaikos F.C. players
Makedonikos F.C. players
Greek football managers
Makedonikos F.C. managers
Thermaikos F.C. managers
A.P.S. Zakynthos managers
Anagennisi Giannitsa F.C. managers
Apollon Pontou FC managers
PGS Kissamikos managers
Panegialios F.C. managers
Iraklis Thessaloniki F.C. managers
Panachaiki F.C. managers
Association football forwards
Expatriate football managers in Cyprus
Greek expatriate sportspeople in Cyprus
Footballers from Giannitsa